Sergio Casal and Emilio Sánchez were the defending champions, but none competed this year. Sánchez opted to rest after winning at Stuttgart in the previous week, alongside Wally Masur.

Richard Krajicek and Jan Siemerink won the title by defeating Francisco Clavet and Magnus Gustafsson 7–5, 6–4 in the final.

Seeds

Draw

Draw

References

External links
 Official results archive (ATP)
 Official results archive (ITF)

Doubles